1,2-Dioleoyl-sn-glycerophosphoethanolamine is a non-bilayer lipid of the phosphatidylethanolamine class, it adopts non-lamellar reverse hexagonal structures. It forms part of Lipofectamine, a common transfection reagent.

References

Phospholipids
Glycerol esters
Phosphatidylethanolamines